Liu Chao-shiuan (born 10 May 1943) is a Taiwanese educator and politician. He is a former president of the National Tsing Hua University (1987–1993) and Soochow University (2004–2008) and a former Premier of the Republic of China (2008–2009).

Early life
Liu was born in Changsha, Hunan in 1943. He received his bachelor's degree from National Taiwan University in 1965, a master's from Université de Sherbrooke in 1968, and a Ph.D. from the University of Toronto in 1971. He earned all of his academic degrees in the field of chemistry.

Liu is also an author, and, together with two of his brothers, has published novels of ancient Chinese rovers practicing martial arts under a pen name called "Shangguan Ding".

Liu started to receive public attention when he was the President of National Tsing-hua University in Hsinchu before 1993. At that time, he and his school had just successfully hosted the annual unified college entrance examinations in Taiwan. He became the President of Soochow University in 2004.

Liu's nephew is Citizen University founder Eric Liu, who was a White House speechwriter and policy adviser for President Bill Clinton of the United States.

ROC Transportation Ministry

Liu was subsequently served as Minister of Transportation and Communications from 1993 to 1996.

ROC Vice Premiership
Liu next served as the Vice Premier from 1997 to 2000.

ROC Premiership
In April 2008, Liu was asked by current President Ma Ying-jeou to serve as the Premier of the Republic of China. He accepted the post and his term as Premier took effect with Ma's incoming administration on 20 May 2008.

Liu and his Cabinet resigned en masse on 10 September 2009, with Wu Den-yih succeeding the post of Premiership.

Liu had suffered mounting criticism over the aftermath of Typhoon Morakot, and had initially tendered his resignation to President Ma in mid-August. Liu, however, was asked by President Ma to remain and oversee initial relief efforts as they were carried out. Liu said, during his resignation announcement, that 90% of subsidies have been distributed and 92% of those displaced have been temporarily relocated.

See also

Politics of the Republic of China
Elections in the Republic of China

References

|-

|-

|-

|-

1943 births
National Taiwan University alumni
Affiliated Senior High School of National Taiwan Normal University alumni
Premiers of the Republic of China on Taiwan
Taiwanese educators
University of Toronto alumni
Academic staff of Soochow University (Taiwan)
Living people
Politicians from Chengdu
Taiwanese Ministers of Transportation and Communications
Republic of China politicians from Hunan
Université de Sherbrooke alumni
Presidents of National Tsing Hua University
Recipients of the Order of Brilliant Star
Recipients of the Order of Chiang Chung-Cheng
Taiwanese people from Hunan
Ministers of Science and Technology of the Republic of China
People from Liuyang